The 1943 Western Michigan Broncos football team represented Michigan College of Education (later renamed Western Michigan University) as an independent during the 1943 college football season.  In their second season under head coach John Gill, the Broncos compiled a 4–2 record and outscored their opponents, 151 to 89.  The team played its home games at Waldo Stadium in Kalamazoo, Michigan. Halfback Bob Mellen was the team captain. Fullback August Camarata received the team's most outstanding player award. The team won two games by over 50 points across the season.

Schedule

References

Western Michigan
Western Michigan Broncos football seasons
Western Michigan Broncos football